Marley & Me: The Puppy Years (originally titled Marley & Me: The Terrible 2's) is a 2011 American direct-to-DVD comedy film and prequel to Marley & Me (2008). The film was directed by Michael Damian and written by Damian and his wife Janeen Damian. The film was released on DVD on June 1, 2011.

As the title suggests, the film is about Marley in his puppy years. Marley and his owner's nephew Bodi Grogan (Travis Turner) cause trouble at the local dog contest. Unlike the original film however, Marley is given a speaking voice (voiced by Grayson Russell).

Plot
Marley is a puppy, and according to some people he is "the world's worst dog". While taking care of Marley, Bodi Grogan has to stay with his grandfather, Fred Grogan because his mother, Carol, is on a business trip. So Bodi stays with Marley in his grandfather's house. His grandfather is strict about chores and pushes him around a lot.

One day, while on a walk with Marley (Bodi on his skateboard), Bodi meets a girl named Kaycee. They chat for a while, then Kaycee tells him about a puppy championship. Kaycee, whose parents own a pug rescue center, enters three of her pugs in the contest so she can get money for the center. She tells Bodi to enter Marley in the contest. But, according to rules, a team must have three dogs, so Kaycee tells Bodi about Mrs. Crouch, who has two other lab puppies, named Fuschia and Moose. Together, all three of them train for a course. Meanwhile, elsewhere, Hans Von Weiselberger is being cruel to his three puppies, Turbo, Liesl and Axel. He puts voltage collars on them. If they are not behaving the way he wants, they get shocked. His three puppies were last year's puppy champions, and so Hans wanted to make them even better.

The day before the competition, Bodi sends his pups for a day at the spa, but after the pups finish, a man wearing a spa worker's uniform takes them, along with an Australian Shepherd dog named Dundee, who was also part of the competition. The evil man is Henkle, Hans's assistant. He locks the four of them away with two big German Shepherds, Trouble and Chipper, who were pretending to eat the pups. The pups get scared, but the shepherds say that they were only messing with them. They help the pups escape by using a seesaw which the pups made: one pup would be on one side while one of the shepherds would jump onto the other so that the pups would fly away. All four escape and return to Bodi's home, though they are very dirty. He cleans all four of them and Grandpa calls Dundee's owner, so he goes home.

The next day the championship starts. Everyone does well, but in the middle Marley gets distracted. When the prizes are announced, Bodi is upset because he did not win. Initially, Hans was in the first place, but Marley saves the day. A cat named Cat snips all of Hans's dogs' collars, then Marley takes one collar and puts it in Hans' pocket. When the pups don't obey, Hans turns the collars on, getting an electric shock himself. His remote, which controlled the collars, falls out of his pocket and the judge sees it. He is hence disqualified. The new results are first place for the Australian dogs and second place for Kaycee's pugs. Because Marley saved the day, Bodi gets a prize for good sportsmanship. Bodi, in the middle of the competition, saw his mother and was surprised. His mother, who thought Bodi was irresponsible, sees that he is happy with Marley. He couldn't keep Marley because it was his relative's dog. However, the three dogs who belonged to Hans are not his anymore: one family adopts Liesl and Axel, but Turbo, the last one, was going to be taken to the dog shelter to find a home. Bodi's mother said he could keep him, because she believed Bodi was ready to own a dog.

Cast
Travis Turner as Bodi Grogan: A boy who kept asking his mother, Carol, to get him a puppy, until in the end he did. 
Donnelly Rhodes as Fred Grogan: Bodi's kind but firm grandfather.
Alex Zahara as Hans Von Weiselberger: An evil German man who was cruel to his dogs.
Geoff Gustafson as Henkle: One of Hans' helpers.
Sydney Imbeau as Kaycee: A kind girl who loves pugs and whose parents have a pug rescue center.
Chelah Horsdal as Carol Grogan: Bodi's mom. At first she thought that Bodi wasn't ready for a dog but thinks he is at the end.
Merrilyn Gann as Mrs. Crouch: The owner of Fuchsia and Moose, who team up with Marley.
Garry Chalk as Announcer
Grayson Russell as the voice of Marley 
Kathryn Kirkpatrick as Judge Luckett
Marie West as Helga, another one of Hans' helpers who is attracted to Henkle.
Keith Dallas as Mike
Alexander Matthew Marr as Turbo
Lauren Lavoie as Fuchsia
Ryan Grantham as Moose
Kyle Kirkwood as Axel
Jianna Ballard as Liesl
Ashlyn Drummond as Godiva
Christopher Goodman as Cat
Gordon Grice as Dundee
Brian Drummond as Trouble
Lee Tockar as Chipper
Olivia Krevoy as Jazzy

Soundtrack

References

External links

2011 films
2011 direct-to-video films
20th Century Fox direct-to-video films
American children's comedy films
Direct-to-video prequel films
Fictional duos
Films about dogs
Films about pets
Films directed by Michael Damian
Films shot in Vancouver
Regency Enterprises films
2010s English-language films
2010s American films
American prequel films